Silver lode or Silverlode may refer to:

Silver lode, a deposit of silver found alloyed with gold
Silverlode, fictional river described by English author J. R. R. Tolkien
Silver Lode (film), 1954 American western directed by Allan Dwan

See also
Lode (disambiguation)